MMRP is an initialism that may refer to one of the following:

 Multiple MAC Registration Protocol, defined by the IEEE 802.1Q group.
 Mobile Mesh Routing Protocol, largely replaced by Optimized Link State Routing Protocol (OLSR).